The 2016 Atlantic 10 women's basketball tournament was a tournament that played March 2–6 at the Richmond Coliseum in Richmond, Virginia.

Seeds
Teams are seeded by record within the conference, with a tiebreaker system to seed teams with identical conference records.

Schedule

*Game times in Eastern Time. #Rankings denote tournament seeding.

Bracket

References

See also
2016 Atlantic 10 men's basketball tournament

2015–16 Atlantic 10 Conference women's basketball season
Atlantic 10 women's basketball tournament